Oxana Corso (born 9 July 1995 in Saint Petersburg) is a Russian-born Italian Paralympic athlete. , she holds the Women's 400 metres world records for the T35 cerebral palsy classification. She won a silver medal at the 2012 Summer Paralympics, and competed at the 2020 Summer Paralympics, in 100m T35 and 200m T35.

Biography
Oxana was born in Russia in 1995, she arrived in Italy at the age of three years and she was adopted by the Roman family Corso, that has chosen to adopt her despite cerebral palsy.

She won two gold medals at the 2012 IPC Athletics European Championships. She competed at the 2013 Para World Championships, and 2018 IPC Athletics European Championships.

Achievements

Records

See also
List of IPC world records in athletics
Italy at the 2012 Summer Paralympics

References

External links
 
 Oxana Corso at Fiamme Gialle

1995 births
Living people
Paralympic athletes of Italy
Paralympic silver medalists for Italy
Athletes (track and field) at the 2012 Summer Paralympics
Athletes (track and field) at the 2020 Summer Paralympics
World record holders in Paralympic athletics
Cerebral Palsy category Paralympic competitors
Medalists at the 2012 Summer Paralympics
Paralympic athletes of Fiamme Gialle
Medalists at the World Para Athletics Championships
World Para Athletics Championships winners
Medalists at the World Para Athletics European Championships
Paralympic medalists in athletics (track and field)
Italian female sprinters
Paralympic sprinters